Stephen Harris may refer to:

 Stephen Harris (painter) (1913–1980), British painter
 Stephen Harris (producer) (born 1968), British record producer
 Stephen Harris, musician, also known as Kid Chaos and Haggis
 Stephen E. Harris (born 1936), American professor of applied physics
 Stephen L. Harris (born 1937), American professor of religious studies
 Stephen Randall Harris (1802–1879), mayor of San Francisco, California
 Stephen Ross Harris (1824–1905), U.S. Representative from Ohio
 Stephen Harris (umpire) (born 1980), South African cricket umpire

See also
 Steven Harris (disambiguation)
 Steve Harris (disambiguation)